Fay R. Moulton (April 7, 1876 – February 19, 1945) was an American Olympic sprinter, college football player and coach, and lawyer. He served as the fifth head football coach at Kansas State Agricultural College, now Kansas State University, holding the position for one season in 1900 and compiling a record of 2–4. Moulton medaled as a sprinter at the 1904 Summer Olympics and the 1906 Intercalated Games.

Early life and football playing career
Moutlon was born in Marion, Kansas. He graduated from the University of Kansas in 1900, lettering for the Kansas Jayhawks football team in the 1898 and 1899 seasons. Moulton is now in the KU Athletics Hall of Fame.

Coaching career
In 1900, Moulton was hired as the fifth head football coach for Kansas State Agricultural College, now Kansas State University, in Manhattan, Kansas. His coaching record at Kansas State was 2–4. Moulton also played for the team during the season.

During his one year at Kansas State, Moulton's team was outscored by opponents 100–47. The two victories came against Fairmont College (now called Wichita State University) under Harry Hess and Kansas Wesleyan University. One of the team's two wins for the season, against Kansas Weslyan, was notable because Moulton led his team to victory despite the fact that approximately one-third of the team had been placed on academic suspension for failing mid-term exams.

Unlike modern-day teams, Kansas State football did not draw huge crowds in 1900. After K-State lost a home football game to Kansas State Normal (now Emporia State University) by a score of 11–0, one reporter wrote that "The only disgraceful feature of the whole game was the crowd that witnessed it. The gate receipts did not pay one-third of the expenses. Not until there can be free co-operation of both students and college authorities for the support of the cause can K.A.C. ever hope to be successful on the intercollegiate athletic field."

Olympics
Moulton won a bronze medal at the 1904 Summer Olympics in the men's 60 metre dash. He was beaten in the race by Archie Hahn, who took gold, and William Hogenson, who won silver. Moulton also competed in the 100 metres event and the 200 metres competition, finishing fourth in both events. Two years later, Moulton won the silver medal in the 100 metre competition at the 1906 Intercalated Games.

Legal career
After one year of coaching at Kansas State, Moulton attended Yale Law School, graduating in 1903. He competed for the Yale track team while attending law school. Subsequently, Moulton worked in Kansas City, Missouri, and competed with the Kansas City Athletic Club.

Head coaching record

References

1876 births
1945 deaths
American male sprinters
Athletes (track and field) at the 1904 Summer Olympics
Athletes (track and field) at the 1906 Intercalated Games
Kansas Jayhawks football players
Kansas State Wildcats football coaches
Kansas State Wildcats football players
Olympic bronze medalists for the United States in track and field
Olympic silver medalists for the United States in track and field
Yale Law School alumni
Players of American football from Kansas
Players of American football from Kansas City, Missouri
Track and field athletes from Kansas City, Missouri
People from Marion, Kansas
Missouri lawyers
Medalists at the 1904 Summer Olympics
Medalists at the 1906 Intercalated Games